Risner is an unincorporated community in Floyd County, in the U.S. state of Kentucky.

History
A post office called Risner was established in 1923, and remained in operation until 1984. The community was named after a family of settlers.

References

Unincorporated communities in Floyd County, Kentucky
Unincorporated communities in Kentucky